Vangelis Keramidas (born 12 September 2002) is a Greek professional footballer who plays as a left-back for Super League 2 club Olympiacos B.

References

2002 births
Living people
Super League Greece 2 players
Olympiacos F.C. players
Association football defenders
Footballers from Athens
Greek footballers
Olympiacos F.C. B players